Dan McCarthy is a Canadian jazz vibraphone player living in Brooklyn, New York.

Early life 
McCarthy studied with Don Thompson at Humber College before moving to New York City in 2009.

Career 
McCarthy has performed or recorded with Steve Swallow, Ben Monder, Mark Feldman, Don Thompson, Pat LaBarbera, Ingrid Jensen, Myron Walden, Robin Eubanks, Jeremy Steig, Terry Clarke, among others. With Ralph Turek, McCarthy has authored textbooks on music theory.

Discography 
Interwords, 2006, independent, with Matt Wigton (bass), Greg Ritchie (drums), Myron Walden (saxophones)
Let's Start the Show, 2009, independent, with Tuey Connell (banjo), Dan Loomis (bass), Freed Kennedy (drums)
Constellation, 2008, independent, with Gordon Webster (piano)
Méjis, 2018, independent, with Randy Ingram (piano), Michael Bates (bass), and Jeff Davis (drums)

External links 
 Official website
 Dan McCarthy @ All About Jazz

References 

Canadian jazz vibraphonists
Year of birth missing (living people)
Living people